Wilfred Malleson may refer to:

 Sir Wilfrid Malleson (1866–1946), Major-General in the British Army
 Wilfred St Aubyn Malleson, mMidshipman awarded the Victoria Cross